The Jiquí is a seasonal river in central Cuba. In Cuba it is known as Rio Jiquí.

See also
List of rivers of Cuba

References

The Columbia Gazetteer of North America. 2000.

Rivers of Cuba